The Liberty Monument ("Mnēmeío Eleftherías" or "Eleftheria Monument") is a monument in the city of Nicosia in Cyprus.

The Liberty Monument was erected in 1973 to honor the anti-British EOKA fighters of the Cyprus Emergency of 1955–1959. It is located at the Podocattaro Bastion of the Venetian walls.

The large monument contains several statues. Atop the structure, a statue representing liberty watches over two heroic EOKA fighters pulling chains to open a prison gate, allowing Greek Cypriot prisoners, peasants, and clergy (represented by various statues) to escape British rule.

References

Monuments and memorials in Cyprus
Buildings and structures in Nicosia
Tourist attractions in Nicosia
1973 establishments in Cyprus